Josephine Caroline Gertrude Mary Faith Harber (29 June 1914 – 30 June 1990), known by the stage name Lynne Carol, was a Welsh born actress, primarily in TV series and telemovies. She was best known for playing busybody Martha Longhurst in the soap opera Coronation Street from the second episode in 1960 until the character was killed off in 1964.

Biography

Early life
A descendant of six generations of actors, Lynne Carol (also known as  Josephine Palmer) was born in Monmouthshire, south east Wales, where her actor parents Charles Harber and Mina Harber (née McKinnon) were touring in a stage play. Carol started her own acting career at age three. Before landing the part of Martha Longhurst, Carol worked in the provincial theatre for many years.

Career
Carol, although only 46 years old at the time, played Martha Longhurst as a waspish beldam many years her senior, who first appeared in December 1960; with Ena Sharples, played by Violet Carson and Minnie Caldwell, played by Margot Bryant she made up the formidable trio that held court in the snug of local public house, the Rovers Return. The verbal interplay between the three epitomised the serial's North of England humanity and yielded some of the 'richest moments' in the programme. The renown of Martha Longhurst became such that Carol's unpublicised visit to the Ideal Home Exhibition caused a near riot. She was advised to leave the premises for her own safety. Her fan-base even included such international stars as the actor Laurence Olivier and the poet John Betjeman.

After only three years in the series, the character of Martha Longhurst was axed by a new producer, who assumed that Carol would be likely to find other acting jobs. Carol was deeply shocked to read in the newspaper that the days of her character were now numbered. Martha died quietly of a heart attack in the snug (one of the three bars in the Rovers, the others being the public and the select) of the public house in May 1964. The subsequent burial took place in the Manchester General Cemetery where a special grave had been prepared. Carol remained bitter about Martha's death, and believed to the end that a terrible mistake had been made, as her character was so popular. Viewers responded by complaining in their thousands and, later, the writers acknowledged that they had made a mistake.

Carol later appeared in the short-lived BBC serial The Newcomers, alongside Alan Browning, who later appeared in Coronation Street as Alan Howard. She also appeared in the 1979 film Yanks starring Richard Gere.

Personal life
Carol married Herbert (Bert) Newell Palmer in 1934 in Bideford, Devon. Palmer, born 22 April 1900, was a character actor from Easingwold, Yorkshire, who appeared in numerous television roles, including two episodes of Coronation Street and the pilot episode of its first spin-off, Pardon the Expression. The couple made their home in Blackpool, had two sons and a daughter, and remained married until Palmer's death on 15 January 1980, at the age of 79. Her eldest son, Michael, was killed in an R.A.F. parachutists' air crash disaster at Abingdon,on 7 July 1965.

In April 1990, it was reported that Carol had died in a nursing home in Lytham St Annes, following a hoax telephone call received by Granada Television, while she was visiting her family in Düsseldorf, Germany.

Carol suffered from angina, being hospitalised in May 1990. She died of a heart attack in hospital in Blackpool on 30 June 1990, the day after her 76th birthday.

Filmography

References

External links

1914 births
1990 deaths
English television actresses
20th-century British actresses
English soap opera actresses
20th-century English women
20th-century English people